The Grimselsee or Lake Grimsel is an artificial lake near the Grimsel Pass in the Canton of Berne, Switzerland. With a volume of 95 mio m³ (20.9 billion imperial gallons, 20.1 billion US gallons), it is larger than other hydroelectric reservoirs in the region: Oberaarsee, Räterichsbodensee and Gelmersee. The dam was completed in 1932 and is operated by Kraftwerke Oberhasli AG (KWO). It is located in the municipality of Guttannen.

See also
List of lakes of Switzerland
List of mountain lakes of Switzerland

External links

KWO: Lake Grimsel

Grimsel
Reservoirs in Switzerland
RGrimselsee
Bernese Oberland
Oberhasli
Lakes of the canton of Bern
Dams completed in 1932